Preemption Township is located in Mercer County, Illinois. As of the 2010 census, its population was 1,783 and it contained 737 housing units.  Preemption Township changed its name from Fairfield Township sometime before 1921.

Geography

Demographics

References

External links
City-data.com
Illinois State Archives

Townships in Mercer County, Illinois
Townships in Illinois